Grigory, Grigori and Grigoriy are Russian masculine given names.

It may refer to watcher angels or more specifically to the egrḗgoroi or Watcher angels.

Grigory

 Grigory Baklanov (1923–2009), Russian novelist
 Grigory Barenblatt (19272018), Russian mathematician
 Grigory Bey-Bienko (1903–1971), Russian entomologist
 Grigory Danilevsky (1829–1890), Russian novelist
 Grigory Falko (born 1987), Russian swimmer
 Grigory Fedotov (1916–1957), Soviet football player and manager
 Grigory Frid (1915–2012), Russian composer
 Grigory Gagarin (1810–1893), Russian painter and military commander
 Grigory Gamarnik (born 1929), Soviet wrestler
 Grigory Gamburtsev (1903–1955), Soviet seismologist
 Grigory Ginzburg (1904–1961), Russian pianist
 Grigory Grum-Grshimailo (1860–1936), Russian entomologist
 Grigory Gurkin (1870–1937), Altay landscape painter
 Grigory Helbach (1863–1930), Russian chess master
 Grigory Kiriyenko (born 1965), Russian fencer
 Grigory Kriss (born 1940), Soviet épée fencer
 Grigory Laguta (born 1984), Russian-born Latvian motorcycle speedway rider
 Grigory Landsberg (1890–1957), Soviet physicist
 Grigory Langsdorff (1774–1852), German-Russian naturalist and explorer
 Grigory Leps (born 1962), Russian singer and songwriter of Georgian origin
 Grigory Levenfish (1889–1961), Soviet chess Grandmaster
 Grigory Kaminsky (1894–1938), Soviet politician
 Grigory Kotoshikhin (c. 1630–1667), Russian diplomat and writer
 Grigory Kotovsky (1881–1925), Soviet military commander
 Grigory Kulik (1890–1950), Soviet military commander
 Grigory Mairanovsky (1899–1964), Soviet biochemist and poison developer
 Grigory Margulis (born 1946), Russian mathematician
 Grigory Misutin (born 1970), Ukrainian artistic gymnast
 Grigory Nelyubov (1934–1966), Russian cosmonaut
 Grigory Neujmin (1886–1946), Russian astronomer
 Grigory Novak (1919–1980), Soviet Ukrainian weightlifter
 Grigory Ordzhonikidze (1886–1937), Georgian communist
 Grigory Grigoryevich Orlov (1734–1783), Russian military commander and diplomat, lover of Catherine the Great
 Grigory Ostrovsky (1756–1814), Russian painter
 Grigory Petrovsky (1878–1958), Soviet Ukraininan communist and revolutionary
 Grigory Petrovich Nikulin (1895-1965), Soviet revolutionary
 Grigory Pirogov (1885–1931), Russian bass opera singer
 Grigory Pomerants (1918–2013), Russian philosopher and cultural theorist
 Grigory Potanin (1835–1920), Russian orientalist and explorer
 Grigory Potemkin (1739–1791), Russian military leader, statesman, favorite of Catherine the Great
 Grigory Razumovsky (1759–1837), Ukrainian biologist, geologist and philosopher
 Grigory Romodanovsky (died 1682), Russian military commander and diplomat
 Grigory Romanov (1923–2008), Soviet politician
 Grigory Mikhaylovich Semyonov (1890–1946), Russian military commander
 Grigory Abramovich Shajn (1892–1956), Soviet Russian astronomer
 Grigory Shelikhov (1747–1795), Russian seafarer and merchant
 Grigory or Gregory Skovoroda (1722–1794), Ukrainian philosopher, poet, teacher and composer
 Grigory Sokolov (born 1950), Russian pianist
 Grigory Soroka (1823–1864), Russian painter
 Grigory Sukochev (born 1988), Australian volleyball player
 Grigory Spiridov (1713–1790), Russian admiral
 Grigory Ugryumov (1764–1823), Russian painter
 Grigory Yavlinsky (born 1952), Russian economist and politician
 Grigory Zinoviev (1883–1936), Soviet politician

Grigori
 Grigori Chukhrai (1921-2001), Russian screenwriter and director
 Grigori Galitsin (born 1957), Russian erotic photographer and porn director
 Grigori Kozintsev (1905-1973), Soviet Russian film director
 Grigori Kromanov (1926–1984), Estonian theatre and film director
 Grigori Ivanovitch Langsdorff or Georg von Langsdorff (1774-1852), Prussian aristocrat, politician and naturalist
 Grigori Marchenko (born 1946), Honorary Consul of the Singaporean government to the Kazakh government
 Grigori Panteleimonov (1885-1934), Russian sports shooter
 Grigori Perelman (born 1966), Russian mathematician
 Grigori Rasputin (1869-1916), a Russian mystic
 Grigori Voitinsky (1893-1956), Comintern official
 Grigori Zozulya (1893-1973), Russian artist

Grigoriy 
 Grigoriy Andreyev (born 1976), Russian marathon runner
 Grigoriy Dobrygin (born 1986), Russian actor
 Grigoriy Gruzinsky (1833–1899), Georgian prince
 Grigoriy Myasoyedov (1834–1911), Russian painter
 Grigoriy Mihaylovich Naginskiy (born 1958), Russian politician
 Grigoriy Oparin (born 1997), Russian chess Grandmaster
 Grigoriy Oster (born 1947), Russian author and screenwriter
 Grigoriy Plaskov (born 1898), Soviet artillery lieutenant
 Grigoriy Tarasevich (born 1995), Russian swimmer
 Grigoriy Yablonsky (born 1940), Soviet-born American chemical engineer and professor
 Grigoriy Yegorov (born 1967), Kazakhstani former pole vaulter

Fictional characters 
 Father Grigori, in the computer game Half-Life 2
 Grigori Rasputin (Hellboy), a comic book character
 Grigori Daratrazanoff, a main Carpathian character in Christine Feehan's Dark series
 Grigori, the name of the titular dragon in the computer game Dragon's Dogma
 Grigori Panteleevich Melekhov, in And Quiet Flows the Don

See also 
 Daniel Grigori, an angel in Lauren Kate's Fallen novel series
 Gregory (given name)
 Krikor, Western Armenian variant
 Ryhor, Belarusian variant

Russian masculine given names